HMS Severn is a  of the Royal Navy. Named after the River Severn, the ship is the first to bear the name in 56 years. All three were commissioned into service in 2003 to replace the five older s. The ship was decommissioned in 2017, but the Government decided to recommission her as part of Brexit preparedness. She returned to service in 2020 and was recommissioned into the Royal Navy on 28 August 2021.

Construction
Severn was built by Vosper Thorneycroft Shipbuilding at its shipyard in Woolston, Southampton. Following construction, she was launched on 4 December 2002 as the second vessel of her class. Along with her sister ships, she was among the first vessels to be privately funded by industry and leased to the Royal Navy for five years. On expiry of this lease, the Royal Navy had the option to either purchase the vessels or return them to VT. On 31 July 2003, Severn was commissioned into the Royal Navy in a ceremony attended by her Lady Sponsor Professor Felicity Guild in Portsmouth.

Operational history
Severn undertook her first fishery protection patrol in September 2003. She was also affiliated with the Welsh city of Newport during the same month and awarded the Freedom of the City in June 2006.

Between 2005 and 2006, Severn spent a total of 225 days at sea on fishery protection duties, her busiest year to date.

In September 2012, Severn was purchased by the Royal Navy, along with her sister ships, after their leases had expired.

In October 2014, it was announced that Severn would be the first River-class vessel to deploy overseas to take up the Atlantic Patrol Tasking North, a task traditionally assigned to a frigate or destroyer. Arriving in the Caribbean, Severn patrolled the waters of each British Overseas Territory in the region and was on standby to provide any support, ranging from disaster relief to tackling all forms of illicit trafficking. The ship returned to Portsmouth on 16 July 2015, having visited all of the British Overseas Territories in the region.

In December 2015, acting on intelligence from the British National Crime Agency and French DNRED, the ship intercepted the freighter MV Carib Palm off the south coast of the United Kingdom and escorted the ship to Boulogne-sur-Mer, France, where it was searched by French customs. The search uncovered  of cocaine with a street value in excess of £350 million.

In April 2017, Severn was detached from fishery protection duties to escort the Russian Navy  Korolev through the English Channel.

Decommissioning and reactivation
After making what was presumed to be her final visit to her affiliated town of Newport, Wales, Severn was decommissioned at HMNB Portsmouth on 27 October 2017. In March 2018, six months since decommissioning, the Ministry of Defence announced that £12.7 million had been allocated from the EU Exit Preparedness Fund to preserve Severn and her two sister ships, should they be required to control and enforce UK waters and fisheries following the United Kingdom's withdrawal from the European Union. In November 2018, defence secretary Gavin Williamson confirmed that Severn and her sister ships would be reactivated and "forward operated" from their affiliated ports. However, the idea of forward basing the Batch 1s was reportedly later abandoned. The ships are now to be retained in service until around 2028.

Post-reactivation

Severn underwent a refit in 2019 in preparation for her planned regeneration. Despite plans to forward-operate Severn from her affiliated port, the ship remained base ported in Portsmouth as of 4 February 2020. After passing her Operational Sea Training (OST) assessment, Severn returned to operations in July 2020, although her re-commissioning ceremony was delayed until August 2021 by the COVID pandemic. One of her first operational taskings since rejoining the fleet saw her shadowing Russian Navy destroyer , patrol boat Vasily Bykov and their two support ships as they transited through the English Channel on 9 July 2020.

On 6 May 2021, Severn was deployed to Jersey alongside , another River-class OPV, after reports that fishing boats from France would blockade the ferry Commodore Goodwill from reaching the island at 6am. This was part of a chain of events sparked by a new fishing licence scheme introduced by the Jersey authorities in alleged contravention of an agreement between the UK and the EU nations and without consultation with the French authorities.

Severn was painted in a Western Approaches camouflage scheme in time for her recommissioning ceremony alongside HMS Belfast in the Pool of London on 28 August 2021. The historic scheme is a tribute to sailors who fought in the Battle of the Atlantic. She thereafter, in her role as the navigation training ship, conducted a Fleet Navigation Officer course in mid-September, a week-long training cruise for navigation officers of larger warships.

Affiliations
 City of Newport, Wales 
 The Prince's Trust
 104th Regiment Royal Artillery
 Dragons rugby team
 Worshipful Company of Wheelwrights

References

External links
 Royal Navy HMS Severn (royalnavy.mod.uk)
 Additional pictures of HMS Severn including her visit to Dartmouth, Devon on 24 July 2010

 

River-class patrol vessels
Ships built in Southampton
2003 ships
Ships of the Fishery Protection Squadron of the United Kingdom